Allstars (stylised allSTARS*) were a British pop group, who were active between 2001 and 2002, achieving some chart success in the UK. Consisting of Sam Bloom, Thaila Zucchi, Ashley Taylor Dawson, Rebecca Hunter and Sandi Lee Hughes (the initial letters of the band members' names making up the "stars" of in the name of their group), they were probably best noted for having their own television show, STARStreet*, on CITV between 2001 and 2002.

Formation and split
The group managed to score four Top 20 singles in a year. The first was "Best Friends", which peaked at No. 20 in June 2001. The second was a double A-side of their own track, Things That Go Bump in the Night, and a cover of Duran Duran's "Is There Something I Should Know?", the former track later appearing on the soundtrack to the first Scooby-Doo movie. It reached No. 12 in September 2001.

Their third single, released in January 2002, was another cover, this time of Bucks Fizz's "The Land of Make Believe", and it gave them their first and only top 10 hit, reaching No. 9. Their fourth single, released in late April 2002, was another double A-side, but this time both were original tracks, "Back When" and "Going All the Way", the latter appearing on the soundtrack to the movie Thunderpants. This however reached No. 19, and when their self-titled debut album only managed to peak at No. 43 – spending only 2 weeks in the UK Albums Chart, the band parted ways with their record company, Island, and split up soon after, in June 2002. The album was re-released with a bonus remix CD.

The band appeared in their own television programme STARStreet* which aired on ITV1's CITV block where they played fictionalised versions of themselves living inside a supernatural house. The show's theme tune was "Best Friends" and in each episode the band would perform one of their songs. The first season aired in early 2001 and was often repeated on CITV throughout the year and the second season aired in Spring 2002. The series ended when the band split up. STARStreet* has also aired in Canada on Vrak.tv as S.T.A.R.S in french.

Before the band split up, there was an soundtrack album from STARStreet*, which was going to be released however, due to the band splitting up, the album titled STARStreet: The Music was cancelled.

After the band
 Thaila Zucchi did some presenting work in the Meridian region of ITV, which included announcing the regional results for Record of the Year in 2003. In 2005, she played the Bunny Boiler character in Channel 4's Balls of Steel. In 2006, she was one of the lead characters in Channel 4's Star Stories. She also appeared as "fake" housemate Pauline in Big Brother 8 but was evicted for being found out to be fake by the housemates. In Summer 2007, she appeared in an advert for Setanta Sports with Des Lynam. She played minor roles in Shameless and Hollyoaks Later in 2013.
 Rebecca Hunter played Melanie in Channel Five soap opera Family Affairs from 2003 to 2005. She got married in 2007 and moved to California. She has two children; a son born in 2010 and a daughter born in 2013.
 Ashley Taylor Dawson returned to playing the role of Darren Osborne in Channel 4's Hollyoaks in 2003, having previously left the role when he joined Allstars. In 2010 he was nominated for three British Soap Awards. He is engaged to Karen McKay and they have two sons called Buddy Mac and Mason Taylor Dawson. He also appeared on Strictly Come dancing with partner Ola Jordan in 2013.
 Sandi Lee Hughes has kept a low profile since the band's separation. She married children's TV presenter Dominic Wood in 2005 and the couple appeared on ITV1's All Star Mr & Mrs in May 2008. They have two sons: Tommy and Sam.
 Sam Bloom appeared in minor roles in The Last Detective and Kerching! in the mid-2000s before embarking on a short stage career. In 2009 he co-founded 'Inspiring Interns', an award-winning recruitment agency for interns and graduates in Central London.

Discography

Albums

Singles

References

English pop music groups
English dance music groups
Musical groups established in 2001
Musical groups disestablished in 2002
2001 establishments in England